Cowboys & Angels is an Irish film released on 14 May 2003 at the Cannes Film Market in France. Set in Limerick city, the movie stars Michael Legge as Shane and Allen Leech as Vincent, Shane's gay roommate. The film was directed by David Gleeson, who also directed the gritty Dublin thriller The Front Line.

Plot
The story concerns a hapless civil servant Shane (Michael Legge) who gets more than he bargained for when he moves into an apartment with Vincent (Alan Leech), a gay fashion student. The film sets out to explore the difficulties faced by young people in keeping their identities in a fast moving culture of drugs and clubs.

Shane strikes up a friendship with Jerry (Frank Kelly) an elderly civil servant who implores Shane to do more with his life. Shane though is attracted to Vincent's flamboyant easy-going lifestyle. Vincent plans to finish fashion college and move to New York to work on his own fashion line. He takes the uptight Shane under his wing and encourages him to relax more. The two become fast friends but Shane's life begins to spiral out of control when he gets involved with a botched drug run.

Things come to a climax when Jerry passes away and the botched drug run catches up with him. Both Vincent and Shane get arrested for drug possession in a Garda raid. Vincent panics as a drug conviction will end his dream of going to New York while Shane fears it will see him laid off from the Civil Service. Just as all seems lost the Guard on duty arrives and Vincent recognises the Garda as a married man he was seeing previously. The charges are dismissed and both Vincent and Shane are released.

The death of Jerry and the incident with the Gardaí force Shane to decide a change is warranted. Vincent encourages him to enter art school and the film ends with Vincent boarding a plane bound for New York while Shane enters art school.

Cast and crew

Awards
Dallas Out Takes - Michael Legge won best actor.
Giffoni Film Festival - David Gleeson (director) won AGIS Gold Medal and ARCA Enel Award.

References

External links

2003 films
2003 comedy-drama films
English-language Irish films
Gay-related films
Irish independent films
Irish LGBT-related films
2003 directorial debut films
2003 LGBT-related films
LGBT-related comedy-drama films
2003 independent films
2000s English-language films